The 1929–30 Serie B was the first tournament of this round robin competition played in Italy after its creation.

Teams
The 18 clubs were the last 7 of each group of 1928–29 Divisione Nazionale, the first 3 teams of the 1928–29 Prima Divisione, and the winner of the special 1928–29 Southern Championship.

League table

Results

References
 emeroteca.coni.it 
 Serie B 1929-30 by rsssf.com 

1929-1930
2
Italy